Sękowa is a historic village in southern Poland first incorporated by an edict issued on February 22, 1363, by King Kazimierz Wielki.

The village is the site of St. Philip's and St. James' church, built in the beginning of the 16th century, one of the six Wooden Churches of Southern Poland, inscribed on the UNESCO list of World Heritage Sites since 2003.

Sękowa is the seat of rural Gmina Sękowa, administrative district in Gorlice County, Lesser Poland Voivodeship/ Małopolska Voivodeship or Małopolska Province, on the Polish Slovak border.

References 

  Urząd Gminy Sękowa
  Strona o Gminie
  Stowarzyszenie Gminne w Sękowej

Villages in Gorlice County
World Heritage Sites in Poland